Edwin Corle (May 7, 1906 – June 11, 1956) was an American writer.

Biography
He was born in Wildwood, New Jersey and educated at the University of California, Berkeley, where he received his A.B. in 1928. For the next two years he was a graduate student at Yale University.

In 1932 he married Helen Freeman in Ensenada, Mexico.

He served in World War II, and in 1944 married Jean Armstrong. His prolific writing career led to a final residence at Hope Ranch, Santa Barbara where he died on June 11, 1956.

Writing
His writing is noted for realistic portrayals of American Indian life in the early 20th century. After a brief stint at writing for radio, Corle began writing numerous short stories and non-fiction pieces for magazines. In 1934 his Mojave: A Book Of Stories was published. This was followed a year later by his first and most successful novel, Fig Tree John, based on a Cahuilla Indian from southern California. In addition to other novels, Corle also wrote non-fiction, including books on the Grand Canyon and the Gila River. His sophisticated interest in the arts is reflected in his works on Igor Stravinsky and the artist Merle Armitage. In the 1950s, Corle began what was to be his most important effort, a multi-volume novel called "The Californians". The work was left uncompleted upon his death and is included in his extensive papers, letters and manuscripts donated by Ralph B. Sipper of Santa Barbara to Indiana University in 1997. Another important collection of his papers, including correspondence with Lawrence Clark Powell, is in the Special Collections of UCLA.

Legacy
For many years the Library of the University of California at Santa Barbara has sponsored an Edwin and Jean Corle Lecture Series.

Bibliography
 Billy the Kid. Albuquerque: University of New Mexico Press, 1979, [1953].
 Burro Alley. New York: Duell, Sloan & Pearce, 1938.
 Coarse Gold. New York: E.P. Dutton and Co., 1942.
 Death Valley and the Creek Called Furnace. Los Angeles: Ward Ritchie Press [1962].
 Desert Country, American Folkways Series. New York: Duell, Sloan and Pearce. 1941.
 Fig Tree John. [Los Angeles]: Ward Ritchie, 1955.
 The Gila, River of the Southwest. New York: Rinehart, 1951. (Part of the Rivers of America Series)
 In Winter Light. New York: Duell, Sloan and Pearce, 1949.
 John Studebaker, an American dream. New York: E. P. Dutton; 1948.
 Listen, Bright Angel. New York: Duell, Sloan and Pearce [1946]
 Mojave: A Book of Stories. New York: Liveright. 1934.
 People on the Earth. New York: Random House. 1937.
 The Royal Highway (El Camino Real). Indianapolis: Bobbs-Merrill, 1949.
 Solitaire. New York: E. P. Dutton, 1940.
 The Story of the Grand Canyon.  New York: Duell, Sloan and Pearce. 1951.
 Three Ways to Mecca. New York: Duell, Sloan and Pearce. 1947.

References

Further reading
 Pilkington, William T. My blood's country; studies in Southwestern literature. [Fort Worth] Texas Christian University Press, 1973.
 
 Powell, Lawrence Clark. "Rivers of books : a tribute to Edwin Corle". Los Angeles Clark. Press coll. Period. Rare Book Stacks UCLA.

1906 births
1956 deaths
University of California, Berkeley alumni
Yale University alumni
People from Wildwood, New Jersey
Writers from New Jersey